Robert Edward "Bob" Page ( 14 September 1936 – 14 April 1991) was a New Zealand rowing cox.

At the 1962 British Empire and Commonwealth Games he won the silver medal as part of the men's eight alongside crew members Leslie Arthur, Darien Boswell, Colin Cordes, Alistair Dryden, Alan Grey, Christian Larsen, Louis Lobel and Alan Webster. After having received an invitation to the Henley Royal Regatta, he won the inaugural Prince Philip Challenge Cup regatta in 1963 in Henley-on-Thames. That year, the Henley regatta was regarded as the event that came closest to a world championship. Darien Boswell, Peter Masfen, Dudley Storey, and Alistair Dryden made up the rowers, and Page was the cox.

The same coxed four team then went to the 1964 Summer Olympics in Tokyo, where they placed eighth. At the 1968 Summer Olympics in Mexico he was part of the men's eight that came fourth in the final.

Page died on 14 April 1991, and was cremated at Purewa Crematorium in Auckland.

References

1936 births
1991 deaths
New Zealand male rowers
Rowers at the 1962 British Empire and Commonwealth Games
Commonwealth Games silver medallists for New Zealand
Rowers at the 1964 Summer Olympics
Rowers at the 1968 Summer Olympics
Olympic rowers of New Zealand
Commonwealth Games medallists in rowing
Rowers from Auckland
Medallists at the 1962 British Empire and Commonwealth Games